Milton "Milt" Herth (November 3, 1902 – June 18, 1969) was an American jazz organist, known for his work on the Hammond organ soon after it was introduced in 1935. Herth's work is available from his recordings of the 1930s and 1940s.

Biography 
Herth was born in Kenosha, Wisconsin,

In 1937, Herth began to work with jazz pianist Willie "The Lion" Smith in Chicago, when Smith was signed to Decca Records. Herth, Smith, and drummer O'Neil Spencer formed the Milt Herth Trio. The trio became a quartet with the addition of Teddy Bunn on guitar in April 1938.

Herth appeared as himself in several short films (Love and Onions (1935), Swing Styles (1939), and Jingle Belles, (1941)) and the longer 1942 film, Juke Box Jenny, a movie noted for being a series of musical performances.

He died in Las Vegas, Nevada on June 18, 1969.

Discography
 The Monkeys Have No Tails in Pago Pago (Decca, 1939)
 Ain't She Sweet (Coral)
 Hi-Jinks on the Hammond (Capitol)
 Milt Herth Trio (Decca)

References

External links
 
 Milt Herth recordings at the Discography of American Historical Recordings.

1902 births
1989 deaths
20th-century American musicians
American jazz organists
American male organists
Decca Records artists
Musicians from Chicago
Musicians from Kenosha, Wisconsin
RCA Victor artists
20th-century organists
Jazz musicians from Illinois
20th-century American male musicians
American male jazz musicians
20th-century American keyboardists